Sararud-e Olya (also Romanized as Sarārūd-e ‘Olyā, Sarā Rūd-e ‘Olyā, and Serā Rūd-e ‘Olyā; also known as Sarādūd-e Bālā, Sarārū, and Sarārūd-e Bālā) is a village in Dorudfaraman Rural District, in the Central District of Kermanshah County, Kermanshah Province, Iran. At the 2006 census, its population was 54, in 12 families.

References 

Populated places in Kermanshah County